Tirupati railway station (station code: TPTY) is a railway station located in the Indian state of Andhra Pradesh. It serves Tirupati and experiences a regular flow of tourists visiting the Tirumala Venkateswara Temple in the Tirupati district. It is an environmentally friendly station, and has been awarded a Gold rating by the Indian Green Building Council. There are several railway stations that fall within the city limits of Tirupati, namely Tiruchanur, Renigunta Junction, Tirupati West Halt, and Chandragiri railway station.

History 
The metre-gauge line of the South Indian Railway Company was opened in 1891. The line originally started from Villupuram in the South Arcot district and passed through Katpadi and Chittoor to Pakala. The Gudur–Katpadi line, covering Tirupati, has since been converted to broad gauge.

Gallery

Classification 

Tirupati is classified as an A1–category station in the Guntakal railway division. It is one of the top one hundred booking stations among the Indian railways.

Structure and amenities 

There are solar panels installed on the rooftop of stations along the railway, including 500 MW solar energy panels.

The following facilities have been upgraded recently with an estimated cost of around 11 Crores:

 A new waiting hall in platforms 4 and 5 for the convenience of travelers, with a seating capacity of 210 people, in an area of over 1.200 square meters.
 High-speed Wi-Fi and LED TV facilities.
 A cloakroom on platform 1, with an area of 100 square meters. Around 50 steel racks have been installed in the room for the safe deposit of passenger luggage.
 The existing booking office, announcement facility, and display board area have been renovated.
 A premium lounge of over 350 square meters has been developed in platform 1 with an estimated cost of around 1.06 crores. It has state of the art facilities for travelers, including washrooms, lounges, and food and drink locations.

References

External links 

 Railway stations in Chittoor district
Transport in Tirupati
Guntakal railway division
1891 establishments in India
Indian Railway A1 Category Stations